The episodes of Night Wizard: The Animation, the 2007 Japanese animated television series, are directed by Yusuke Yamamoto and produced by Hal Film Maker and Omnibus Promotion, which produced the animation and sound respectively. They are based on the Night Wizard! role-playing game released by Enterbrain in 2002, and adapt the source material over thirteen episodes. The plot of the episodes follows Renji Hiiragi, a magic user known as a "Night Wizard" that protects the world against demonic beings called Emulators, as he protects newly ordained Night Wizard Elis Shihō on their quest to find the Jewels of Virtue.

The episodes aired from October 2, 2007 to December 25, 2007 on Chiba TV, Tokyo MX TV, and TV Aichi. TV Osaka and TV Saitama broadcast the episodes later in October, and Kids Station started airing the episodes in November.

Two pieces of theme music are used for the episodes; one opening theme and one closing theme. A single for "Kurenai" was released on November 21, 2007, and a single for "Erinyes" was released on the same date.

Seven DVD compilations have been planned for release by Geneon Entertainment in Japan. The first DVD, containing the first episode of the anime, was released on December 21, 2007, and the second compilation, containing the next two episodes, is slated for release on January 25, 2008.

Episode list

References
General

Specific

External links
Official website 
Official Kids Station website 

Night Wizard